The 2022 FIFA World Cup qualification UEFA Group I was one of the ten UEFA groups in the World Cup qualification tournament to decide which teams would qualify for the 2022 FIFA World Cup tournament in Qatar. Group I consisted of six teams: Albania, Andorra, England, Hungary, Poland and San Marino. The teams played against each other home-and-away in a round-robin format.

The group winners, England, qualified directly for the World Cup finals, while the runners-up, Poland, advanced to the second round (play-offs).

Standings

Matches
The fixture list was confirmed by UEFA on 8 December 2020, the day following the draw. Times are CET/CEST, as listed by UEFA (local times, if different, are in parentheses).

Goalscorers

Discipline
A player was automatically suspended for the next match for the following offences:
 Receiving a red card (red card suspensions could be extended for serious offences)
 Receiving two yellow cards in two different matches (yellow card suspensions were carried forward to the play-offs, but not the finals or any other future international matches)
The following suspensions were served during the qualifying matches:

Notes

References

External links

Qualifiers – Europe, FIFA.com
European Qualifiers, UEFA.com

Group I
2020–21 in Albanian football
2021–22 in Albanian football
2020–21 in Andorran football
2021–22 in Andorran football
2020–21 in English football
2021–22 in English football
England at the 2022 FIFA World Cup
2020–21 in Hungarian football
2021–22 in Hungarian football
2020–21 in Polish football
2021–22 in Polish football
Poland at the 2022 FIFA World Cup
2020–21 in San Marino football
2021–22 in San Marino football